Robert Langton (8 September 1918 – 13 January 1996) was an English footballer who played for the majority of his career for Lancashire clubs. He played mostly on the left wing. He represented his country eleven times between 1946 and 1950. After retiring in 1957, he became football manager.

Langton represented Bombay in Santosh Trophy. In mid-20th century, he appeared in Rovers Cup, one of the oldest club football tournaments, with visiting army team.

Playing career
Born in Burscough, he signed for Blackburn Rovers from youth team Burscough Victoria in 1937. He became the team's leading scorer in his second season with fourteen goals but his career was curtailed by the Second World War which he spent part of as an infantryman in India, although when stationed in Northern Ireland he did help Glentoran to win the Irish Cup in 1945.

He won the first of eleven England caps in a 7–2 defeat of Ireland in 1946 and would go on to play for the national team until 1950 by which time he had changed clubs twice, first to Preston North End for £16,000 in 1948 and then on to Bolton Wanderers for a then club record of £20,000 in November 1949. At Bolton he provided many goals for Willie Moir and Nat Lofthouse, picking up a losers medal in the "Matthews Final", in which he made a goal for Moir.

In dispute with Bolton in the run up to the final, it proved to be Langton's final game for the club. He returned to Blackburn Rovers in September 1953 and served them for a further three years before seeing out his professional career back in Northern Ireland with Ards. Langton then went into non-league football, with three seasons at Wisbech Town before moving to Kidderminster Harriers and finally seeing his career out with a one-month spell at Colwyn Bay.

Management career

Scouting for Accrington Stanley followed, as well as coaching for King's Lynn and Wisbech before he finally returned home to Burscough to become manager of the local team where he won the Lancashire Combination Cup and the Lancashire Junior Cup. He finally left football in 1971. Bobby Langton died after a short illness in January 1996. Two years later the road that goes past Burscough's ground was renamed Bobby Langton Way after him.

References

External links
Biography on Burscough F.C. website

1918 births
1996 deaths
English footballers
Association football wingers
English Football League players
Bolton Wanderers F.C. players
Blackburn Rovers F.C. players
Preston North End F.C. managers
England international footballers
British Army personnel of World War II
People from Burscough
Glentoran F.C. players
Ards F.C. players
Wisbech Town F.C. players
Kidderminster Harriers F.C. players
Colwyn Bay F.C. players
English Football League representative players
Preston North End F.C. players
English football managers
FA Cup Final players